The Progress Party was a political party active in Thailand between 1983 and 1989.

History 
The Progress Party was founded on 10 December 1980 and registered on 22 March 1983 by Uthai Pimjaichon who had been speaker of the House of Representatives from April to October 1976 and later broken away from the Democrat Party.

In the 1983 general election the Progress Party won three seats. In the 1986 general election the Progress Party won seven seats and in the 1988 general election the Progress Party won eight seats. Most of the party's seats represented constituencies in Eastern Thailand, more particularly Chachoengsao and Chonburi provinces. In 1989 Progress Party merged into the Solidarity Party.

General election results

References

See also 
 List of political parties in Thailand

Defunct political parties in Thailand
1980 establishments in Thailand
Political parties established in 1980
Political parties disestablished in 1989